Lazar Popović (born 11 April 1993) is a Serbian football attacker who plays for FAP.

He was called to Serbia U19 national selection under coach Zoran Marić.

References

External links
 
 Lazar Popović stats at utakmica.rs 
 

1993 births
Living people
People from Raška, Serbia
Association football forwards
Serbian footballers
FK Radnički 1923 players
FK FAP players
Serbian First League players
Serbian SuperLiga players